Pseudoscopelus is a genus of snaketooth fishes.

Species
There are currently 16 recognized species in this genus:
 Pseudoscopelus altipinnis A. E. Parr, 1933
 Pseudoscopelus aphos Prokofiev & Kukuev, 2005
 Pseudoscopelus astronesthidens Prokofiev & Kukuev, 2006
 Pseudoscopelus australis Prokofiev & Kukuev, 2006
 Pseudoscopelus bothrorrhinos M. R. S. de Melo, H. J. Walker & Klepadlo, 2007
 Pseudoscopelus cephalus Fowler, 1934
 Pseudoscopelus cordilluminatus M. R. S. de Melo, 2010
 Pseudoscopelus lavenbergi M. R. S. de Melo, H. J. Walker & Klepadlo, 2007
 Pseudoscopelus obtusifrons (Fowler, 1934)
 Pseudoscopelus odontoglossum M. R. S. de Melo, 2010
 Pseudoscopelus parini Prokofiev & Kukuev, 2006
 Pseudoscopelus paxtoni M. R. S. de Melo, 2010
 Pseudoscopelus pierbartus Spitz, Quéro & Vayne, 2007
 Pseudoscopelus sagamianus S. Tanaka (I), 1908
 Pseudoscopelus scriptus Lütken, 1892
 Pseudoscopelus scutatus G. Krefft, 1971

References

Chiasmodontidae
Marine fish genera
Taxa named by Christian Frederik Lütken